The 1982 Washington Huskies football team was an American football team that represented the University of Washington during the 1982 NCAA Division I-A football season.  In its eighth season under head coach Don James, the team compiled a 10–2 record, finished second in the Pacific-10 Conference, defeated Maryland in the Aloha Bowl, and outscored its opponents 354 to 193.

Washington lost the Apple Cup for the first time in nine years, a four-point loss in Pullman which knocked the Huskies out of the Rose Bowl. With the win in the Aloha Bowl, Washington climbed to seventh in the final rankings.

Senior placekicker Chuck Nelson was selected as the team's most valuable player.  Anthony Allen, Ken Driscoll, Paul Skansi, and Mark Stewart were the team captains.

Schedule

Roster

Game summaries

at Arizona State

    
    
    
    
    
    

Jacque Robinson - 34 rushes, 124 yards.

NFL Draft selections
Eleven University of Washington Huskies were selected in the 1983 NFL Draft which lasted twelve rounds with 335 selections.

References

Washington
Washington Huskies football seasons
Aloha Bowl champion seasons
Washington Huskies football